Enera was a Roman–Berber civitas (town) in the province of Numidia. It is believed to have been located in modern Algeria. The town was also a former Roman Catholic diocese.

The only known bishop of this bishopric was Massimino, who took part in the Council of Carthage (411). Enera is now a titular bishopric. Its current bishop is José Aparecido Gonçalves de Almeida, of Brasília.

References

Ancient Berber cities
Catholic titular sees in Africa
Roman towns and cities in Tunisia
Archaeological sites in Tunisia